The Felony Squad is a half-hour television crime drama originally broadcast on the ABC network from September 12, 1966, to January 31, 1969, a span encompassing seventy-three episodes.

Overview
The program starred Howard Duff (as Sergeant Sam Stone) and Dennis Cole (as Detective Jim Briggs) as investigators in a major crimes unit.  The setting was an unidentified West Coast city (background scenes obviously show Los Angeles, and L.A. City Hall is shown at dusk in the final scene of the opening credits). Duff's character was the veteran who was teaching his younger partner the nuances of life in this new facet of police work. Another main character was desk sergeant Dan Briggs (portrayed by Ben Alexander), the father of Cole's character.

Originally titled Men Against Evil, the show was set to be a soap opera-type program about a police captain.  However, when the concept proved to be unworkable, the project was changed to a standard police drama with three main characters.  In addition, following primary sponsor Liggett & Myers' objection about being associated with the word "evil," the show's title was changed.

For the first two years of the series aired, it was broadcast on Monday nights, with 30 episodes comprising a season's run. In the Fall of 1968 it was switched to a Friday evening time slot, a move that proved disastrous. The program was cancelled at midseason after just thirteen aired episodes.  The final episode of the series was part of a crossover with the ABC legal drama Judd, for the Defense, starring Carl Betz.  The stunt also proved to be no more effective for Judd, which was cancelled at the end of its season after a two-year run.

Alexander's role in the series was not only onscreen but also offscreen as a technical adviser.  His earlier work with Jack Webb in Dragnet was the basis for this added position, but ironically resulted in his inability to reprise his role of Officer Frank Smith when Webb revived Dragnet in late 1966. He died of a heart attack less than six months after The Felony Squad left the air.
                                 
The Felony Squad was sponsored by L&M cigarettes, as seen on the 1967 episode "The Day Of The Shark Part 1".

Regular Cast

Howard Duff as Detective Sgt. Sam Stone (73 episodes, 1966-1969)
Dennis Cole as Detective Jim Briggs (73 episodes, 1966-1969)
Ben Alexander as Desk Sgt. Dan Briggs (73 episodes, 1966-1969)
Frank Maxwell as Captain Frank Nye (13 episodes, 1966-1968)
Len Wayland as District Attorney Adam Fisher (recurring)

Guest Stars

Joe Don Baker as Shep in "My Mommy Got Lost" (1967)
Francis De Sales as Harmon in "The Broken Badge" (1966)
Rodolfo Hoyos, Jr., as Pepe Enciras in "Epitaph for a Cop" (1968)
Don Keefer as Harry Jocelyn in "A Most Proper Killing" (1967)
Ricky Kelman as Donny Clement in "The Fatal Hours" (1968)
John M. Pickard as Cahill in "A Blueprint for Dying" (1968)
Eric Shea as Mike Bradley in "A Date with Terror" (1966)
Brooke Bundy as Betty Joyce in "The Deadly Innocents" (1968)
Lana Wood as Sherry Martin in "The Last Man in the World" (1967)

Episodes

Season 1: 1966–67

Season 2: 1967–68

Season 3: 1968–69

References

External links

 
 YouTube compilation of Batman window cameos

American Broadcasting Company original programming
1960s American crime drama television series
Television series by 20th Century Fox Television
1966 American television series debuts
1969 American television series endings
English-language television shows
American detective television series